Carole Amoric-Andraca (born 7 August 1960) is a retired French swimmer. She competed in the women's 4 × 100 metre freestyle relay at the 1984 Summer Olympics.

References

External links
 
 Carole Amoric at Amicale des Internationaux Française de Natation

1960 births
Living people
Olympic swimmers of France
Swimmers at the 1984 Summer Olympics
Competitors at the 1981 Summer Universiade
Sportspeople from Val-de-Marne
French female freestyle swimmers
20th-century French women